Miguel Sámano Peralta (born 23 May 1966) is a Mexican politician affiliated with the PRI. He served as Deputy of the LX Legislature of the Mexican Congress representing the State of Mexico, and previously served in the LVII Legislature of the Congress of the State of Mexico.

References

1966 births
Living people
Politicians from the State of Mexico
Members of the Congress of the State of Mexico
Institutional Revolutionary Party politicians
21st-century Mexican politicians
Deputies of the LXII Legislature of Mexico
Deputies of the LXV Legislature of Mexico
Members of the Chamber of Deputies (Mexico) for the State of Mexico